Ralph Golen is a former Polish-born Canadian footballer. He played the majority of his career in Canada particularly in the USL A-League and the Canadian National Soccer League.

Playing career
Golen began his professional soccer in 1987 with the North York Rockets of the Canadian Soccer League. His greatest success with North York was in 1991 when they defeated the Nova Scotia Clippers with a 9-1 goal aggregate to advance to the league cup semi-finals. In 1994, North York re-branded itself as the Toronto Rockets and moved from the Canadian National Soccer League to the American Professional Soccer League. After finishing last in the standings, the Rockets folded from the league due to a financial dispute with the league's front office. He returned to the CNSL in 1995 by signing with Toronto Italia. He made his debut for the club on August 7, 1995 in a cup match against London City. In 1996, he signed with Oakville Canadian Westerns. He reached the playoffs with Oakville by finishing fourth in the league standings. He featured in the semi-final match against Toronto Italia, but unfortunately were eliminated by the eventual playoff champions by a score of 5-4 goals on aggregate.

In April, 1997 he signed with newly expansion franchise the Toronto Lynx of the USL A-League, his signing was announced in a press conference which revealed the team roster. Golen made his debut for the club on April 12, 1997 in the Lynx's first official match against Jacksonville Cyclones; the game would eventually result in a 3-1 defeat for the fledgling side. Golen assisted the club in qualifying for the post season for the first time in the franchise's history, by finishing 4th in the Northeastern division. The Lynx were eliminated in the first round of the playoffs against the Montreal Impact. He returned to the Lynx the following year where he appeared in 17 matches, but failed to make the post season by finishing second last in their division.

During the winter of 1998 he signed with the Montreal Impact indoor team which operated in the National Professional Soccer League, he appeared in 3 matches.

References

External links

Living people
American Professional Soccer League players
Canadian Soccer League (1987–1992) players
Polish footballers
Montreal Impact (1992–2011) players
National Professional Soccer League (1984–2001) players
North York Rockets players
Toronto Italia players
Toronto Lynx players
Toronto Rockets players
People from Stalowa Wola
Sportspeople from Podkarpackie Voivodeship
Canadian National Soccer League players
Association football midfielders
1970 births